Aleksandr Kostin (born 4 July 1995) is a Russian Paralympic athlete specializing in long-distance running. He represented Russian Paralympic Committee athletes at the 2020 Summer Paralympics.

Career
Kostin represented Russian Paralympic Committee athletes at the 2020 Summer Paralympics in the men's 5000 metres T13 event and won a bronze medal.

References 

1995 births
Living people
People from Biysk
Medalists at the World Para Athletics Championships
Medalists at the World Para Athletics European Championships
Paralympic athletes of Russia
Athletes (track and field) at the 2020 Summer Paralympics
Medalists at the 2020 Summer Paralympics
Paralympic medalists in athletics (track and field)
Paralympic bronze medalists for the Russian Paralympic Committee athletes
Russian male long-distance runners
Sportspeople from Altai Krai
21st-century Russian people